Trevi (Latin: Trebiae) is an ancient town and comune in Umbria, Italy, on the lower flank of Monte Serano overlooking the wide plain of the Clitunno river system. It is 10 km (6 mi) SSE of Foligno and 20 km (12 mi) north of Spoleto.

The population of the comune was c. 8,000 in 2004, with the town proper accounting for about half of that; the rest lives in the frazioni of Borgo, Bovara, Cannaiola, Coste, Pigge, Manciano, Matigge, Parrano, Picciche, San Lorenzo and Santa Maria in Valle. The historical subdivisions of Trevi proper are the terzieri of Castello, Matiggia e Piano; they come into play only for the Palio.

Most of the town, densely inhabited and of decidedly medieval aspect, lies on sharply sloping terrain, only the very center being more or less flat. It commands one of the best views in Umbria, extending over 50 km (30 mi) in most westerly directions. Trevi is served by the main rail line from Rome to Ancona as well as the line from Florence to Rome via Perugia.

Geography

The territory of the comune, extends over 71 km2 from the valley (210 m) to Mts. Brunette (1422 m) and Serano (1429 m) and can be divided into three more or less equal zones: plain, hills, and mountain; each with its own characteristic vegetation. In the plain, the very fertile land is well irrigated by many watercourses, heirs for the most part to the "Lacus Clitorius" of Antiquity, and is suited to annual crops. The hills, of a very loose alkaline limestone with excellent drainage, are an ideal terrain for the intensive and highly specialized cultivation of olive trees that produce a very characteristic and highly prized oil. Finally, the mountains are covered in meadows and forests, primarily deciduous.

The natural environment of the territory as a whole remains largely unspoiled, this despite being significantly populated for millennia. The mountainous area is now witnessing a considerable depopulation — as elsewhere in Italy, in the second half of the 20th century settlements at the highest elevations have been rapidly losing their inhabitants to the plains. The most important growth areas since the period following World War II have been Borgo Trevi (commercial, residential, and offices), Pietrarossa (industrial), and Matigge (light and medium industry, commercial).

Many rivers and canals, none of them very large, run in a general south-to-north direction, converging into a single river near Bevagna. Their courses are by now highly artificial, the result of land and water management projects undertaken over many centuries, since they are recorded at least as early as the time of Theodoric the Great (6th century) and have continued down to our own time with the construction of dams and works to regularize the seasonal waters of the Marroggia that had been subject to frequent torrential overflows with sudden and disastrous results.

The most important of the year-round watercourses is the Clitunno River, celebrated in antiquity as the Clitumnus, whose deified waters were reputed to have miraculous properties and which have been lauded in prose and verse by Pliny the Younger, Propertius, Claudian, Addison, Byron and Carducci.

Trevi borders the following municipalities: Campello sul Clitunno, Castel Ritaldi, Foligno, Montefalco, Sellano, Spoleto.

History

In Antiquity, Pliny the Elder mentioned Trevi as a city of the ancient Umbrians, which has been confirmed by the find of an Umbrian inscription within the territory of the comune, at Bovara, in the 1950s. Treviae is also mentioned in the 5th‑century Bordeaux Itinerary. After the earliest period, the history of which is essentially unknown, but to which the walls in the core hill portion of the town attest, dated to the 1st century BC, the first stage of the development of Trevi beyond the hill took place under the Empire, when Hadrian restored the main road through the territory, the Via Flaminia, thus spurring the growth of a suburb in the plain at the place now called Pietrarossa, where sporadic excavations over several centuries have brought to light many remains: among them Roman baths that appear to have been still more or less in use in the time of St. Francis, who is known to have visited the area and to have advised people to bathe there.

In antiquity Trevi is said to have had jurisdiction over much of the valley below, all the way to the Monti Martani that form the central backbone of Umbria. The seat of a bishop until the 11th century, Trevi was a Lombard gastaldate, then, in the early 13th century, freed itself of outside rulership to become a free commune. It generally allied itself with Perugia in order to defend itself from nearby Spoleto, and fought several wars with other neighboring communes, with varying outcomes, including invasion by Spoleto in the 14th century and a brief but unhappy rule of the Trinci warlords of Foligno. In 1438 Trevi passed under the temporal rule of the Church as part of the legation of Perugia, and thenceforth its history merges first with that of the States of the Church, then (1860) with the united Kingdom of Italy.

Trevi's best fortunes were in the 15th century, when its commercial importance was such that it was called "il porto secco" — the dry port. In 1470, along with Foligno, Trevi became the fourth town in Italy to have a printing press, managed by the first known printing company. The wealth of this period can still be seen in a number of Renaissance mansions in town.

Durastante Natalucci (1687–1772) was an Italian historian who specialized in the history of Trevi.

Main sights

Trevi is enclosed in two circuits of medieval walls; in the late 20th century, the inner circuit was shown to be of Roman origin.

Trevi has about twenty old churches, several of which are of note:
The Duomo of Sant' Emiliano is a Romanesque building with a carved door and an apse with carved corbels, the interior of which was significantly reworked in the 18th century.
The Madonna delle Lacrime is a medieval conventual church with large votive frescoes, including an Adoration of the Magi by Pietro Perugino, his last known signed and dated work. The chapel of Saint Francis was frescoed by Lo Spagna, one of Perugino's pupils.
S. Martino, with Lombard lapidary remains and good paintings by Mezzastris.
S. Francesco, a large Gothic building, now housing a museum.
San Pietro in Bovara is a medieval monastery in Bovara
Santo Stefano in Manciano, another monastery in Manciano, has only its church remaining.

The territory of the comune is particularly rich in Romanesque churches: some of those in the plain, erected on the Roman Via Flaminia when that road was in use, and incorporating a fair amount of Roman spolia, remain as markers of the road's course.

Museums

Trevi's main museum is the Museo S. Francesco, attached to the Gothic church of that name, now secularized; it contains some slight Roman lapidary material, but a more important collection of Umbrian painting from the late Middle Ages through the 17th century: the main work is the Coronation of the Virgin altarpiece by Lo Spagna, originally in San Martino. Particularly notable are a group of ex-votos representative of 16th‑ through 18th‑century folk art.

The Museo della Civiltà dell' Olivo provides an educational look at the olive industry, from the planting of the olive through its processing into oil; the Trevi Flash Art Museum (Now Museum of Palazzo Lucarini) houses contemporary art exhibitions.

Economy

The mainstays of Trevi's economy are olive oil and tourism.

The comuni of Trevi and Spoleto are known for the quality of their oil, a result of near-ideal calcareous soil with excellent drainage, just the right altitude for the cultivation of olive trees, and favourable climatic conditions on the west-facing lower slopes of the Apennine mountain range.

Trevi's good train and highway access has made the town the most convenient base for visiting central Umbria for those who rely on public transportation; the unusual number of good restaurants in the comune is partly the cause, partly the result of increased tourism.

Trevi also has some light industry and food processing other than olive oil.

Holidays and local events
The patron saint of Trevi is St. Emiliano; his feast is celebrated on January 27 with a night-time procession of the Illuminata, in which his statue is carried out of the Duomo around the city along the line of the earliest medieval walls.

Shrove Tuesday sees a public celebration in the main piazza, and August a 3‑week-long music festival; but the main annual festivals take place in October: the Palio on the first Sunday, the Celery and Sausage Fair (Sagra del Sedano Nero e della Salsiccia) on the third Sunday, and a historical pageant on the fourth Sunday.

References
(Portions translated and adapted from Pro Trevi, by permission.)

External links

Official website
Trevi Tourist Office (Pro Trevi)
Trevi Flash Art Museum
Trevi Olive Oil Museum
Bill Thayer's site

Cittaslow
Hilltowns in Umbria
Roman sites of Umbria